Lepidonectes clarkhubbsi, known commonly as the signal triplefin, is a species of triplefin blenny in the genus Lepidonectes. It was described by William Albert Bussing in 1991 and he gave it a specific name which honours the American ichthyologist Clark Hubbs (1921–2008). This species occurs in the eastern Pacific Ocean where it is found off Costa Rica and Panama. The signal triplefin is found on rocky shores where it feeds on very small invertebrates and algae.

References

Signal triplefin
Fish described in 1991